Harry Gordon Swan (August 11, 1887 – May 9, 1946) was a professional baseball pitcher who played for the Kansas City Packers of the Federal League. Swan played in only one Major League Baseball game in his career on April 2, 1914. He pitched one inning, allowing no hits, one base on balls, and striking out one batter.

External links

1887 births
1946 deaths
Kansas City Packers players
Major League Baseball pitchers
Baseball players from Pennsylvania